Paul Andrews may refer to:
 Paul Andrews (Australian politician) (1955–2009), Labor member of the Western Australian Legislative Assembly
 Paul Andrews (British politician)
 Paul Andrews (NASCAR) (born 1957), NASCAR crew chief
 Paul Andrews (scientist) (born 1953), British physiologist
 Paul Martin Andrews (born 1959), American rape survivor and advocate for rape survivors
 Paul Andrews, birth name of ex-Iron Maiden singer Paul Di'Anno (born 1958)
 Paul Andrews Jr. (died 2021), founder of TTI, Inc. and chairman of Mouser Electronics